Laurence Michelmore (1909 – April 10, 1997) was UNRWA's Commissioner-General from 1964 to 1971. Michelmore had been senior director of the UN's Technical Assistance Board, deputy director of personnel, and administrative consultant of the UN Special Fund and the Secretary-General's representative on Malaysia.

See also
 List of Directors and Commissioners-General of the United Nations Relief and Works Agency for Palestine Refugees in the Near East

References

UNRWA officials
American diplomats
1909 births
1997 deaths
American officials of the United Nations